Duncan McRae (1873–1931) was a British actor and film director. Much of his acting work was done in the United States.

Selected filmography
Actor
 The House of the Lost Court (1915)
 Cohen's Luck (1915)
 The Woman's Law (1916)
 That Sort (1916)
 The Flower of No Man's Land (1916)
 Red, White and Blue Blood (1917)
 My Own United States (1918)

Director
 June Friday (1915)
 Through Turbulent Waters (1915)
 The Auction Mart (1920)
 Money (1921)

References

External links

 

1873 births
1931 deaths
British male film actors
Male actors from London
British film directors
20th-century British male actors
British expatriate male actors in the United States